Trick for Trick is a 1933 American pre-Code mystery film directed by Hamilton MacFadden, written by Howard J. Green, and starring Ralph Morgan, Victor Jory, Sally Blane, Tom Dugan, Luis Alberni and Edward Van Sloan. It was released on April 21, 1933, by Fox Film Corporation.

Synopsis
Police investigate when the assistant of the magician Azrah is found dead in a river, but he manages at first to evade any responsibility for the incident.

Cast        
Ralph Morgan as Azrah
Victor Jory as La Tour
Sally Blane as Constance Russell
Tom Dugan as Albert Young
Luis Alberni as Metzger
Edward Van Sloan as John Russell 
Willard Robertson as Dr. Frank Fitzgerald
Dorothy Appleby as Maisie Henry
Boothe Howard as Detective Lt. Jed Dobson
Phillip Trent as David Adams
Adrian Morris as Boldy

References

External links 
 

1933 films
Fox Film films
American mystery films
1933 mystery films
Films directed by Hamilton MacFadden
American black-and-white films
1930s English-language films
1930s American films